John Paul Evans (born May 2, 1954) is a Canadian former professional ice hockey centre who played three seasons in the National Hockey League (NHL) for the Philadelphia Flyers.

Career statistics

References

External links
 

1954 births
Canadian ice hockey centres
Chicago Cougars draft picks
Ice hockey people from Toronto
Kitchener Rangers players
Living people
Los Angeles Kings draft picks
Maine Mariners players
Philadelphia Flyers players
Saginaw Gears players
Springfield Indians players